The 2022–23 Stanford Cardinal women's basketball team will represent Stanford University during the 2022–23 NCAA Division I women's basketball season. The Cardinal will be led by thirty-seventh year head coach Tara VanDerveer, and they will play their home games at Maples Pavilion as members of the Pac-12 Conference.

Offseason
Due to COVID-19, the NCAA ruled in October 2020 that the 2020–21 season would not count against the eligibility of any basketball player, thus giving all players the option to return in 2021–22. Additionally, any players who have declared for the 2022 WNBA draft—including seniors, who must opt into this year's draft—have the option to return if they make a timely withdrawal from the draft and end any pre-draft relationships with agents. Thus, separate lists will initially be maintained for confirmed and potential departures.

Team departures

Outgoing Transfers

Acquisitions

Recruiting

Recruiting class of 2023

2022 WNBA draft

Preseason

Preseason rankings

Source:

Preseason All-Pac-12 teams 
 

Source:

Award watch lists 
Listed in the order that they were released

Roster

Schedule

|-
!colspan=12 style=""| Exhibition

|-
!colspan=12 style=| Non-conference regular season

 

|-
!colspan=12 style=| Pac-12 regular season

|-
!colspan=12 style=|Pac-12 Women's Tournament
 
 
|-
!colspan=12 style=|NCAA Women's Tournament

 

Source:

Bracket

Note: * denotes overtime

NCAA tournament

* denotes overtime period</onlyinclude>
 -->

Game summaries
This section will be filled in as the season progresses.

Vanguard (exhibition)

San Diego State

Cal State Northridge

at Pacific

at Portland

Cal Poly

No. 1 South Carolina

vs Florida Gulf Coast

vs Grambling State

at Hawaii

Santa Clara

No. 23 Gonzaga

Tennessee

Creighton

California

Arizona State

Arizona

at California

at UCLA

at USC

Utah

Colorado

Oregon State

Oregon

at Washington State

at Washington

at Arizona

at Arizona State

USC

UCLA

at Colorado

at Utah

Awards and honors

Sources:

Sources:

Midseason awards watchlists

Sources:

Final awards watchlists

Sources:

National awards

Sources:

Rankings

See also
2022–23 Stanford Cardinal men's basketball team

Notes

References

Stanford Cardinal women's basketball seasons 
Stanford
Stanford
Stanford
Stanford